One for the Road is a 1980 live album and video by the Kinks.

Reception

In his 1980 review of the album for Smash Hits, David Hepworth said that the album was "as convincing an argument for banning live albums as you'll find". In their brief review, Allmusic wrote that "One for the Road is a fascinating document of trailblazing elder statesmen who paved the way for heavy metal and punk, but never felt a glorious pop song was out of their grasp."

Track listing
All tracks written by Ray Davies.
"Opening" – 1:43 
 "Hard Way" – 2:42 
 "Catch Me Now I'm Falling" – 4:49 
 "Where Have All the Good Times Gone" – 2:16 
 Intro: Lola – 0:54 
 "Lola" – 4:47 
 "Pressure" – 1:31 
 "All Day and All of the Night" – 3:45 
 "20th Century Man" – 6:19  * 
 "Misfits" – 3:57 
 "Prince of the Punks" – 3:52 
 "Stop Your Sobbing" – 2:38 
 "Low Budget" – 5:57 
 "Attitude" – 3:52 
 "(Wish I Could Fly Like) Superman" – 6:29 
 "National Health" – 4:08 
 "Till the End of the Day" – 2:42 
 "Celluloid Heroes" – 7:22 
 "You Really Got Me" – 3:35 
 "Victoria" – 2:34 
 "David Watts" – 2:05 
(*) omitted from original CD but reinstated on remastered CD 
LP side 1: tracks 1-7 
LP side 2: tracks 8-12 
LP side 3: tracks 13-16 
LP side 4: tracks 17-21

Video
 "Opening"
 "All Day and All of the Night"
 Intro: Lola
 "Lola"
 "Low Budget"
 "(Wish I Could Fly Like) Superman"
 "Attitude"
 "Celluloid Heroes"
 "Hard Way"
 "Where Have All the Good Times Gone?"
 "You Really Got Me"
 "Pressure"
 "Catch Me Now I'm Falling"
 "Victoria"
 "Day-O" (snippet sung)

Personnel
The Kinks
Ray Davies – guitar, harmonica, keyboards, vocals
Dave Davies – lead guitar, backing vocals
Ian Gibbons – keyboards, backing vocals
Mick Avory – drums
Jim Rodford – bass, backing vocals

Additional personnel
Nick Newall – additional keyboards

Technical
Barry Ainsworth / Mobile I – recording
Mike Moran / RCA Mobile Truck – recording
Arnie Rosenberg / Roadmaster II – recording
Brooks Taylor / Showco, Inc. – recording
Michael Ewasko – mixing engineer
Howard Fritzson – art direction
Lauren Recht – photography

Charts
Album

Certifications and sales

References

The Kinks live albums
1980 live albums
Arista Records live albums
Albums produced by Ray Davies